Ideonella dechloratans is a chlorate-respiring bacterium from the genus  Ideonella and  family  Comamonadaceae.

References

External links
Type strain of Ideonella dechloratans at BacDive -  the Bacterial Diversity Metadatabase

Comamonadaceae
Bacteria described in 1994